Gaius Julius Victor (4th century AD) was a Roman writer of rhetoric, possibly of Gaulish origin. His extant manual is of some importance as facilitating the textual criticism of Quintilian, whom he closely follows in many places.

References

Attribution:

Rhetores Latini minores, Karl Halm (ed.), Lipsiae in aedibus B. G. Teubneri, 1863, pp. 371-448.
 C. Julii Victoris Ars rhetorica, Remo Giomini; Maria Silvana Celentano (eds.) Leipzig: Teubner, 1980.

4th-century Romans
4th-century Latin writers
Ancient Roman rhetoricians
Victor, Gaius